Noctubourgognea bicolor is a moth of the family Noctuidae. It is found in Bahía Orange, Patagonia, Estrecho de Magallanes and Tierra del Fuego in Chile and the  San Martín de los Andes and Neuquén in Argentina.

The wingspan is about 44 mm. Adults are on wing in March.

External links
 Noctuinae of Chile

Noctuinae